Morvi State, also spelled as Morvee State or Morbi State, was a princely salute state in the historical Halar prant (district) of Kathiawar during the British Raj.

The town of Morvi (Morbi), Gujarat, was its capital. The Kotwals of the royal palace of Morvi were Talpada Kolis of Radhavanaj village of Kheda district.

The rulers of the princely state belonged to the Jadeja dynasty of Rajputs.

The state's last ruler signed the instrument of accession to the Dominion of India on 15 February 1948.

History 

Morvi was founded as a princely state around 1698 by Kanyoji when the heir apparent of Cutch State fled Bhuj with his mother after his father Ravaji was murdered and the throne was seized by his uncle Pragmalji I. It became a British protectorate in 1807. The state was in the colonial sway of the Kathiawar Agency of the Bombay Presidency.

In 1943, with the implementation of the 'attachment scheme', Morvi State enlarged its territory by an additional 310 km2 with about 12,500 inhabitants when the Hadala Taluk and the Kotda-Nayani Thana, as well as the small Malia princely state were merged.
 
On 15 August 1947, the state officially ceased to exist by merging into the west Indian United State of Saurashtra (initially - of Kathiawar), which later merged into Bombay state; since that was divided, it is in Gujarat.

Rulers 

The rulers of the state belonged to the Jadeja clan of Rajputs, and bore the title Thakur Sahib until the last added the higher title Maharaja in 1926.

Thakur Sahibs 

1698 - 1733                Kanyoji Rawaji (of Kutch)    (d. 1733)
1733 - 1739                Aliyaji Kanyoji              (d. 1739)
1739 - 1764                Rawaji Aliyaji I             (d. 1764)
1764 - 1772                Pachanji Rawaji              (d. 1772)
1772 - 1783                Waghji I Rawaji              (d. 1783)
1783 - 1790                Hamirji Waghji               (d. 1790)
1790 - 1828                Jyaji Waghji                 (d. 1828)
1828 - 1846                Prithirajji Jyaji            (d. 1846)
1846 - 17 February 1870    Rawaji II Prithirajji        (b. 1828 - d. 1870)
17 February 1870 – 11 July 1922  Waghji II Rawaji     also called Kathiyawadi American  (b. 1858 - d. 1922) (personal style Maharaja from 16 February 1887) (from 30 June 1887, Sir Waghji II Rawaji)
17 Feb 1870 -  1 Jan 1879  Regents (Council of administration)
- Shambhuprasad Laxmilal
- Jhunjhabai Sakhidas (to 187.)
11 July 1922 – 3 June 1926  Lakhdirji Waghji  (see below)  (b. 1876 - d. 1957)

Thakur Sahib Maharaja 

3 June 1926 – 15 August 1947  Lakhdirji Waghji    (s.a.) (from 1 January 1930, Sir Lakhdirji Waghji)

See also 

 Political integration of India
 Western India States Agency

References

External links and sources 

 

Kathiawar Agency
Princely states of Gujarat
Rajput princely states
Salute states
Jadejas
Morbi district
Rajputs
1948 disestablishments in India
1698 establishments in India